Presidential elections were held in Georgia on 28 October 2018. As no candidate received more than 50% of the vote in the first round, a runoff between Salome Zourabichvili and Grigol Vashadze was held on 28 November 2018. Salome Zourabichvili won with around 60% of the vote in the second round and took office on 16 December 2018.

Following amendments to the constitution in 2017, the 2018 elections were the last direct presidential vote; presidents will subsequently be elected by a 300-member College of Electors. In view of these changes, the President was elected for a term of six years in 2018.

Background
The pre-election period was marred by a polarized political environment and a series of secret tape recordings aired by the pro-opposition Rustavi 2 TV, leading to allegations of kidnappings and torture by investigators to secure convictions, pressure and coercion on businesses and media, high-level corruption, and selective justice.

Candidates
46 people applied to participate in the elections, 21 of which were rejected by the Election Administration of Georgia. 25 presidential candidates were registered by the Election Administration of Georgia. This is the largest number since Georgia's first presidential election in 1991. All 25 candidates were included on the ballot paper.

Withdrawn

Democratic Movement
Nino Burjanadze, Georgian politician and lawyer who served as Chairman of Parliament of Georgia (2001-2008). She has served as the acting President of Georgia twice. She backed out of the election on 8 September.

Declined

Independent 
Giorgi Margvelashvili, incumbent President, officially refused to take part in the election in late August.

Opinion polls

Second round

Approval ratings

Results

By territory

Reactions
International observers assessed the elections as competitive and free, stressing that "one side enjoyed an undue advantage and the negative character of the campaign on both sides undermined the process", while the misuse of administrative resources "blurred the line between party and state." However, Transparency International, based on information from a state agency employee, alleged that state agencies were publishing fake identity cards to allow Zourabichvili supporters to cast multiple ballots in the election. According to the plan, five fake IDs were published per individual, and "trustworthy" officials of agencies were vested with the duty of conducting such action.

The Parliamentary Assembly of the Council of Europe stated that the elections were "competitive and professionally administered," but noted concerned about a  "substantial imbalance in donations", "excessively high spending limits", and a "lack of analytical reporting" as contributing factors to creating an unlevel playing field.

On 29 November, the day after the run-off results were released, the United National Movement leader-in-exile Mikheil Saakashvili encouraged supporters not to accept the election results and to hold demonstrations against the newly elected president. He also called for civil disobedience toward the police and armed forces.

Notes

References

Presidential election
Georgia
Georgia
Georgia
Presidential elections in Georgia (country)